Arnold Henry Wagner (September 9, 1878 – September 9, 1949) was a musicologist and linguist who helped pioneer the improvement of voice and musical vibrato and advanced the theory of the psychology of music. He developed techniques to correct bad vibrato in singers' voices and in string and woodwind instruments, which was previously thought impossible. Over four decades he taught music and foreign singing language at the University of Southern California.

Personal life 

Wagner was the son of William Henry Wagner, a farmer and American Civil War veteran, and Harriet Parmelia Arnold. He was the youngest of seven children born in Lisbon, St. Lawrence County, New York, and raised in nearby Ogdensburg. His father conducted local choruses and community singing events and greatly influenced the young Arnold.

Arnold Wagner married Pearl Carlotta Comer, a concert pianist and the daughter of Levi Calvin Comer and Hattie Sheets, on June 28, 1915, in Los Angeles, CA. The couple had no children.

Education 

Wagner attended rural schools and at the Odgensburg Grammar School and Free Academy. He earned his lifetime teaching certificate at the State Normal and Training School in Potsdam, New York. In 1904, he traveled to Europe to study the French, German and Italian languages. He returned to the United States in 1906. By 1911, he resumed his education in Los Angeles. In 1919, he earned a Bachelor's of Arts degree at the University of Southern California (USC) and a Master's Degree in 1924 in music. He continued his studies at the Teachers College at Columbia University in 1925-1926. He spent summers from 1924 to 1928 at the State University of Iowa where he received his doctorate degree in music.

Career 

With his Potsdam Normal School teaching credentials, he began his career as a teacher in 1900 in Adirondack, New York. However, he quickly accepted a position offered by the United States government to teach English and music in the Philippines. He was part of the first batch of 100 students in 1901 to go overseas to teach English, music and art. He initially taught in the provinces before moving to Manila.

He returned to the United States in 1904 and became a music supervisor for the public school systems in Douglas and Bisbee, Arizona.

Returning to Los Angeles in 1911, Wagner taught at local schools before joining the Santa Monica Unified School District in 1913 to teach music and language. He later became head of the music department. Meanwhile, he taught music during the summers at USC and at the University of California, Berkeley, from 1921 to 1924, and at the University of California, Los Angeles, in 1925. By the mid-1920s he was a permanent professor at USC, teaching English, French, German, Italian and Spanish as it applied to singing. He also directed the university's glee clubs and directed choruses in addition to teaching courses in music appreciation and mentoring new teachers.

In the 1930s, he collaborated on two important voice and music projects. He conducted a series of experiments with Dr. Joel Pressman at Cedars of Lebanon Hospital in Los Angeles on vocal registration. Pressman had an expertise in the larynx and developed a technique to film the larynx working.

Among his findings, particularly in his collaboration with Pressman, Wagner found that vocal artists must pay close attention to refining their vibrato during performances and learn to control to increase or diminish the vibrato rate and the extent of oscillation. By exercising conscious control singers can modulate the rate if it becomes too slow or too fast, or the oscillation becomes inappropriate to the emotion of the performance. To establish that control, Wagner argued that vocalists, whether a child or adult, must pay attention to the action the musculature of the larynx that will lead to correct habits of control. Repetition and practice can lead to successful command of the vibrato. Many vocal artists, with the rise of radio and motion picture musical performances in the 1920s and 1930s, had difficulty with pitch. Wagner's study, "An Experimental Study in Control of the Vocal Vibrato," provided singers with a path to exercise control over oscillation and pitch.

Wagner also conducted research with Dr. Carl E. Seashore, a prominent psychologist and educator, at the State University of Iowa where they studied the vibrato in the voice and its application to string and woodwind instruments. The focus was to remedy bad vocal vibrato. The research resulted in Seashore's book, "Studies in the Psychology of Music, Vol. 1," in which Wagner contributed the chapter "Remedial and Artistic Development of the Vibrato."

When military veterans returned from overseas following World War II, they sought a university education, but were impatient with the stilted rules of teaching grammar and language. Wagner streamlined courses with his own teaching method of “Grammar Rules in Rime.”

Death 

Wagner died in 1949 at the age of 71 in Los Angeles. His widow, Pearl Comer Wagner, died in 1966, also in Los Angeles.

Published work 
 The Emotional Factors in Artistic Singing (Pacific Coast Musician, May 1927)
 The Vibrato as a Factor in Artistic Singing (Pacific Coast Musician, June 1927)
 Interpretation in Singing (Music Supervisors Journal, May 1928)
 An Experimental Study in the Control of the Vocal Vibrato (University of Iowa Psychology Monographs, 1930)
 Research in the Field of Voice Training (Music Educators’ National Conference, 1939-1940)
 C. Seashore, ed., Studies in the Psychology of Music, Vol. 1, "Remedial and Artistic Development of the Vibrato" chapter, (University of Iowa, 1932)

References 

American musicologists
Educators from New York (state)

1878 births
1949 deaths